Doris Aileen Bartholomew (born 1930) is an American linguist whose published research specialises in the lexicography, historical and descriptive linguistics for indigenous languages in Mexico, in particular for Oto-Manguean languages. Bartholomew's extensive publications on Mesoamerican languages span five decades of active research. She has also published extensively on Zapotecan languages and the Otomi language. She has been editor-in-chief and publications director for the Instituto Lingüístico de Verano (ILV), the affiliate body incorporated in Mexico for SIL International.

Studies and academic career
As an undergraduate Bartholomew attended Columbia Bible College in Columbia, South Carolina, from where she graduated in 1952. Her doctorate studies were undertaken at the University of Chicago, obtaining her PhD in 1965. Her doctoral dissertation concerned the reconstruction and historical linguistics of the Oto-Pamean languages.

Bartholomew conducted linguistic fieldwork among several different indigenous Mexican language communities, while working as publications coordinator for ILV's bilingual dictionary unit. She also lectured part-time in linguistics at El Colegio de México.

Partial bibliography
Bartholomew's published works include:

 
 
 
 
 Bartholomew, Doris (1963). "The Reconstruction of Otopamean (Mexico)" (Ph.D. diss.,. University of Chicago, 1965)

Notes

References

External links
 List of Bartholomew's works, at Ethnologue by SIL International

1930 births
Living people
American anthropologists
American women anthropologists
Linguists from the United States
Translators of the Bible into indigenous languages of the Americas
Missionary linguists
American Mesoamericanists
Women Mesoamericanists
20th-century Mesoamericanists
Linguists of Mesoamerican languages
Columbia International University alumni
University of Chicago alumni
Academic staff of El Colegio de México
Women linguists
20th-century translators
20th-century American women writers
20th-century American non-fiction writers
Linguists of Uto-Aztecan languages
Linguists of Oto-Manguean languages
American women non-fiction writers
American women academics
21st-century American women